Yosdenis Cedeno (born February 12, 1985) is a Cuban-American mixed martial artist who formerly fought in the Lightweight division in the Ultimate Fighting Championship.

Mixed martial arts career

Early career
A professional since 2009, Cedeno began his career competing primarily for regional promotions in his adopted home of South Florida, where he compiled a record of 9-2 before signing with the UFC in early 2014.

Ultimate Fighting Championship
Cedeno made his promotional debut on February 22, 2014, at UFC 170 where he faced fellow newcomer Ernest Chavez.  Chavez defeated Cedeno in a back and forth fight via split decision.

Cedeno faced Jerrod Sanders on July 16, 2014, at UFC Fight Night 45.  Cedeno defeated Sanders via TKO after the first round as Sanders was unable to continue.

Cedeno faced Chad Laprise on October 4, 2014, at UFC Fight Night 54.  Cedeno lost the fight via unanimous decision.

Cedeno faced Cody Pfister on July 11, 2015, at UFC 189. He lost the fight by unanimous decision. Following back to back losses, Cedeno was released from the promotion.

Post-UFC career
After the release, Cedeno signed with Titan FC and made his promotional debut against Jason Novelli at Titan FC 38 on April 30, 2016. The bout was ruled a draw.

He made his sophomore appearance in the promotion against Kurt Holobaugh at Titan FC 42 on December 2, 2016. He lost the fight via third-round submission.

Cedeno then faced Pedro Gomes at Underground Cage Fighting Championship 1 on July 21, 2018. He won the fight via unanimous decision.

Cedeno was scheduled to face fellow UFC veteran Michel Quiñones at Action Fight League - War at the Rock 1 on February 16, 2019. However, Quiñones withdrew from the bout and was replaced by Felipe Douglas. Cedeno lost the fight via unanimous decision.

Bare-knuckle boxing
Cedeno made his debut in the sport against Alan Arzeno at BKFC 18 on June 26, 2021. He won the bout via split decision.

He made his sophomore appearance against Mario Vargas at BKFC: KnuckleMania 2 on February 19, 2022. He won the fight via unanimous decision.

Mixed martial arts record

|-
|Loss
|align=center|11–7–1
|Felipe Douglas
|Decision (unanimous)
|Action Fight League: War at the Rock 1
|
|align=center|3
|align=center|5:00
|Hollywood, Florida, United States
|
|-
|Win
|align=center|11–6–1
|Pedro Gomes
|Decision (unanimous)
|Underground Cage Fighting Championship 1
|
|align=center|3
|align=center|5:00
|West Palm Beach, Florida, United States
|
|-
|Loss
|align=center|10–6–1
|Kurt Holobaugh
|Submission (rear-naked choke)
|Titan FC 42
|
|align=center|3
|align=center|1:22
|Coral Gables, Florida, United States
|
|-
|Draw
|align=center|10–5–1
|Jason Novelli
|Draw (split)
|Titan FC 38
|
|align=center|3
|align=center|5:00
|Miami, Florida, United States
|
|-
|Loss
|align=center|10–5
|Cody Pfister
|Decision (unanimous)
|UFC 189 
|
|align=center|3
|align=center|5:00
|Las Vegas, Nevada, United States
|
|-
|Loss
|align=center|10–4
|Chad Laprise
|Decision (unanimous)
|UFC Fight Night: MacDonald vs. Saffiedine
|
|align=center|3
|align=center|5:00
|Halifax, Nova Scotia, Canada
|
|-
|Win
|align=center|10–3
|Jerrod Sanders
|TKO (retirement)
|UFC Fight Night: Cowboy vs. Miller
|
|align=center|1
|align=center|5:00
|Atlantic City, New Jersey, United States
| 
|-
|Loss
|align=center|9–3
|Ernest Chavez
|Decision (split)
|UFC 170
|
|align=center|3
|align=center|5:00
|Las Vegas, Nevada, United States
| 
|-
|Win
|align=center|9–2
|Torrance Taylor
|Decision (split)
|CFA 12 - Sampo vs. Thao
|
|align=center|5
|align=center|4:00
|Coral Gables, Florida, United States
|
|-
|Win
|align=center|8–2
|Trent McCown
|Decision (unanimous)
|CFA 11 - Kyle vs. Wiuff
|
|align=center|3
|align=center|5:00
|Coral Gables, Florida, United States
|
|-
|Win
|align=center|7–2
|Ryan DeRocher
|TKO (head kick and punches)
|CFA 9 - Night of Champions
|
|align=center|2
|align=center|0:37
|Coral Gables, Florida, United States
|
|-
|Win
|align=center|6–2
|Anthony Christodoulou
|Decision (unanimous)
|CFA 8 - Araujo vs. Bradley
|
|align=center|3
|align=center|5:00
|Coral Gables, Florida, United States
|
|-
|Win
|align=center|5–2
|Jayson Jones
|TKO (retirement)
|CFA 3 - Howard vs. Olson
|
|align=center| 1
|align=center| 5:00
|Miami, Florida, United States
| 
|-
|Win
|align=center|4–2
|Chino Duran
|KO (punches)
|MFA - New Generation 3
|
|align=center|1
|align=center|2:27
|Miami, Florida, United States
|
|-
|Loss
|align=center|3–2
|Jonathan Brookins
|Decision (unanimous)
|G-Force Fights - Bad Blood 3
|
|align=center|3
|align=center|5:00
|Miami, Florida, United States
|
|-
|Win
|align=center|3–1
|Johnny Iwasaki
|TKO (punches)
|NDC 1 - Peru vs. American Top Team
|
|align=center|1
|align=center|4:09
|Lima, Peru
|
|-
|Loss
|align=center|2–1
|Derek Campos
|Submission
|Art of War - Mano A Mano
|
|align=center|3
|align=center|1:59
|Mesquite, Texas, United States
|
|-
|Win
|align=center|2–0
|Rod Nieves
|TKO (punches)
|XFN - Da Matta vs. Thorne
|
|align=center|1
|align=center|4:26
|Fort Lauderdale, Florida, United States
|
|-
|Win
|align=center|1–0
|Giovanni Moljo
|TKO (punches)
|RFC - Revolution Fight Club 3
|
|align=center|1
|align=center|0:42
|Miami, Florida, United States
|
|}

Bare knuckle boxing record

|-
|Loss
|align=center|2–1 
|Gorjan Slaveski	
|TKO (punches)
|BKFC 35
|
|align=center|4
|align=center|1:53 
|Myrtle Beach, South Carolina, United States
|
|-
|Win
|align=center|2–0
|Mario Vargas
|Decision (unanimous)
|BKFC: KnuckleMania 2
|
|align=center|5
|align=center|2:00
|Hollywood, Florida, United States
|
|-
|-
|Win
|align=center|1–0
|Alan Arzeno
|Decision (split)
|BKFC 18
|
|align=center|5
|align=center|2:00
|Miami, Florida, United States
|
|-

See also
 List of current UFC fighters
 List of male mixed martial artists

References

External links

1985 births
Living people
Cuban male mixed martial artists
American male mixed martial artists
Mixed martial artists utilizing Shitō-ryū
Ultimate Fighting Championship male fighters
Cuban male boxers
American male boxers
Bare-knuckle boxers 
Cuban male karateka
American male karateka
Cuban emigrants to the United States